Anolis semilineatus, the  Hispaniolan grass anole, Santo Domingo anole, or half-lined Hispaniolan grass anole, is a species of lizard in the family Dactyloidae. The species is found in Haiti and the Dominican Republic.

References

Anoles
Reptiles of Haiti
Reptiles of the Dominican Republic
Reptiles described in 1864
Taxa named by Edward Drinker Cope